HMS Constance was a 50-gun fourth-rate frigate of the Royal Navy launched in 1846. She had a tonnage of 2,132 and was designed with a V-shaped hull by Sir William Symonds. She was also one of the last class of frigates designed by him. On her shakedown voyage from England to Valparaiso she rounded Cape Horn in good trim, her captain for this voyage being Sir Baldwin Wake Walker, who commented "I think her a good sea boat, and a fine man of war". On the voyage she encountered a hurricane at 62° south. Walker wrote that "nothing could have exceeded the way she went over it, not even straining a rope yarn". In August 1848 her captain George William Courtenay, for whom the town of Courtenay was named, led 250 sailors and marines from Fort Victoria to try to intimidate the Indians.

In 1848 she became the first Royal Naval vessel to use Esquimalt as her base.

In 1859 she was involved in the bombardment of Dwarka in the state of Gujarat in north western India.

In 1862 she was converted to screw propulsion using a compound steam engine designed by Randolph & Elder. She was the first Royal Naval ship to be fitted with this class of engine, and won a race against two frigates from Plymouth to Madeira in 1865.

Her crew and officers were quarantined aboard whilst berthed at Port Royal on 26 October 1867 during an outbreak of Yellow Fever

References

Bibliography
 Brock, P. W. & Greenhill, Basil Steam and sail: in Britain and North America: 80 photographs mainly from the National Maritime Museum depicting British and North American naval, merchant, and special purpose vessels of the period of transition from sail to steam Pyne Press, 1973
 Sharp, James A. Memoirs of the life and services of Rear-Admiral Sir William Symonds Longman, Brown, Green, Longmans & Roberts 1858
 Rankine, William John Macquorn Miscellaneous Scientific Papers: From the Transactions and Proceedings of the Royal and Other Scientific and Philosophical Societies Adamant. 4 June 2001. 
 Gardiner, Robert Steam, steel & shellfire: the steam warship, 1815-1905 Conway Maritime Press. 20 June 2001. 
 Akrigg, G. P. V. Akrigg, Helen B. British Columbia place names University of British Columbia Press; 3rd edition. 31 December 1997. 
 Gough, Barry M. Gunboat Frontier: British Maritime Authority and Northwest Coast Indians, 1846-1890 University of British Columbia Press. 1st edition. 1 January 1984. 
 Mariner's mirror The Mariner's mirror, Volume 73 Society for Nautical Research., 1987
 The medical times and gazette John Churchill & Sons. 1867
 The Race The annual of the Royal School of Naval Architecture and Marine Engineering Henry Sotheran & Co. 1871.

External links 
 

Frigates of the Royal Navy
1846 ships
Ships built in Pembroke Dock
Age of Sail frigates of the United Kingdom
Victorian-era frigates of the United Kingdom